Cyperus matudae is a species of sedge that is native to south eastern parts of Mexico.

See also 
 List of Cyperus species

References 

matudae
Plants described in 1986
Flora of Mexico